Joseph William D. Lees  (q1 1892 – 26 July 1933) was an English footballer who scored 31 goals from 92 appearances in the Football League playing for Barnsley, Rotherham County, Lincoln City and Halifax Town. He was a member of Rotherham County's team in their first Football League match, a 2–0 home win against Nottingham Forest on 30 August 1919. He played non-league football for several teams, and was on the books of Newport County without representing them in the league. He played as an inside forward.

Lees served in World War One, winning the Military Medal. His son Geoff was also a footballer; both played for Barnsley.

References

1892 births
1933 deaths
Military personnel from Leicestershire
British military personnel of World War I
Recipients of the Military Medal
People from Coalville
Footballers from Leicestershire
English footballers
Association football inside forwards
Whitwick Imperial F.C. players
Barnsley F.C. players
Rotherham County F.C. players
Lincoln City F.C. players
Guildford City F.C. players
Halifax Town A.F.C. players
Scunthorpe United F.C. players
Newport County A.F.C. players
Wombwell F.C. players
Shirebrook Miners Welfare F.C. players
English Football League players